Just My Luck is a 1957 British sports comedy film directed by John Paddy Carstairs and starring Norman Wisdom as a worker in a jewellery shop. The cast also included Margaret Rutherford, Jill Dixon and Leslie Phillips. It was shot at Pinewood Studios near London with sets designed by the art director Ernest Archer.

Plot 
Norman Hackett (Norman Wisdom) is employed in a jeweller's workshop and is innocently preoccupied with dreaming of meeting the window dresser in the shop across the street from his workplace. He wishes to purchase a diamond pendant for her and, after persuasion, gambles a pound on a six-horse accumulator at the Goodwood races. The bookmaker grows concerned when it appears Hackett, after winning on the first five races, could win over £16,000.

Cast 
 Norman Wisdom as Norman Hackett (and his own father)
 Margaret Rutherford as Mrs. Dooley
 Jill Dixon as Anne
 Leslie Phillips as the Hon. Richard Lumb
 Delphi Lawrence as Miss Daviot
 Joan Sims as Phoebe
 Edward Chapman as Mr. Stoneway
 Peter Copley as Gilbert Weaver
 Vic Wise as Eddie Diamond
 Marjorie Rhodes as Mrs. Hackett
 Michael Ward as Cranley
 Marianne Stone as Tea Bar Attendant
 Felix Felton as Man in Cinema
 Michael Brennan as Masseur
 Cyril Chamberlain as Goodwood Official
 Eddie Leslie as Gas Man 
 Freda Bamford as Mrs. Crossley 
 Robin Bailey as Steward 
 Campbell Cotts as Steward 
 Sam Kydd as Craftsman 
 Raymond Francis as Ritchie 
 Ballard Berkeley as Starter at Goodwood (uncredited)
 Jerry Desmonde as Racegoer (uncredited)
 Hal Osmond as Hospital Visitor with Flowers (uncredited)

Critical reception
According to the BFI Screenonline website, "Just My Luck is not a piece of comedic genius, nor even the best of Wisdom's films, but it's an amiable, well-constructed piece that recalls a gentler age".

Box office
Kinematograph Weekly listed it as being "in the money" at the British box office in 1958.

References

External links 
 
 

1957 films
British sports comedy films
1950s sports comedy films
British black-and-white films
Films directed by John Paddy Carstairs
Films shot at Pinewood Studios
1957 comedy films
Horse racing films
1950s English-language films
1950s British films